Brickellia coulteri, or Coulter's brickellbush,  is a North American species of flowering plants in the family Asteraceae. It is native to Mexico (Baja California Sur, Baja California, Sonora, Oaxaca) and the southwestern United States (Arizona, southwestern New Mexico, western Texas).

Brickellia coulteri is a shrub up to 150 cm (60 inches) tall. It has many small flower heads with pale yellow-green disc flowers but no ray flowers.

Varieties
 Brickellia coulteri var. adenopoda (B.L.Rob.) B.L.Turner 
 Brickellia coulteri var. coulteri

The species is named in 1852 for Irish botanist Thomas Coulter (1793 – 1843).

References

External links
photo of herbarium specimen at Missouri Botanical Garden, type specimen of Brickellia coulteri

coulteri
Flora of Mexico
Flora of the Southwestern United States
Plants described in 1853